The 23rd World Science Fiction Convention (Worldcon), also known as Loncon II, was held on 27–30 August 1965 at the Mount Royal Hotel in London, United Kingdom. It was the second Worldcon to be held in London, following the original Loncon in 1957.

The chairman was Ella Parker.

Participants 

Attendance was approximately 350.

Guests of Honour 

 Brian W. Aldiss
 Tom Boardman (toastmaster)

Awards

1965 Hugo Awards 

 Best Novel: The Wanderer by Fritz Leiber
 Best Short Story: "Soldier, Ask Not" by Gordon R. Dickson
 Best Dramatic Presentation: Dr. Strangelove
 Best Professional Artist: John Schoenherr
 Best Professional Magazine: Analog
 Best Fanzine: Yandro edited by Robert and Juanita Coulson
 Publisher: Ballantine Books

See also 

 Hugo Award
 Science fiction
 Speculative fiction
 World Science Fiction Society
 Worldcon

References

External links 

 NESFA.org: The Long List
 NESFA.org: 1965 convention notes 
 Hugo.org: 1965 Hugo Awards

1965 conferences
1965 in London
August 1965 events in the United Kingdom
Science fiction conventions in Europe
Science fiction conventions in the United Kingdom
Worldcon